Isocarpha atriplicifolia is a New World species of plants in the family Asteraceae. It is widely distributed in southern Mexico (Guerrero, Oaxaca, Chiapas), Central America, the West Indies (Cuba, Dominican Republic, Trinidad), and northern South America (Colombia, Venezuela, northeastern Brazil (Maranhão)).

Isocarpha atriplicifolia is an annual or perennial herb up to 120 cm (4 feet) tall. Leaves are up to 10 cm (4 inches) long. One plant produces several flower heads, each a long flower stalk, each head with many white disc flowers but no ray flowers.

References

External links
Photo of herbarium specimen at Missouri Botanical Garden, collected in 1903 on Isla de Pinos (now called Isla de la Juventud, part of Cuba)

Eupatorieae
Flora of Mexico
Flora of South America
Flora of Central America
Plants described in 1756
Flora of the Caribbean
Flora without expected TNC conservation status